Cleidothaerus albidus is a bivalve mollusc of the family Cleidothaeridae, the only member of its genus and family. It is endemic to southeast Australia and the North Island of New Zealand, including the Chatham Islands.

References
 Powell A. W. B., New Zealand Mollusca, William Collins Publishers Ltd, Auckland, New Zealand 1979 
 Photo

 
Bivalves of Australia
Bivalves of New Zealand
Bivalves described in 1819
Taxa named by Jean-Baptiste Lamarck